The E-Flat Man is a 1935 American short comedy film featuring Buster Keaton.

Plot
A mob boss tells his crew to get him some aspirin to treat his aching tooth. Since it is after midnight, his crew break into the closed drug store. Across the street, Elmer (Keaton) waits outside his girlfriend's house as the two plan to elope. The police are alerted to a robbery taking place on the street and when they arrive the robbers escape in Elmer's car and Elmer and his girlfriend mistakenly drive off in the cop car. An alert is put out and Elmer and his girlfriend realize they are now on the run from the police. They take cover on a local farm and hide in a hay bale and in the morning given jobs on the farm: Elmer as a farmhand and his girlfriend as a maid but are soon forced to leave after their description is given again over the farmhouse radio

Back at the station the real robbers are apprehended. Morning arrives and Elmer and his girlfriends are pursued through the cornfields by the police and eventually take cover in a train, not knowing that the compartment they have jumped into is a ventilated refrigerator and they are forced to start a fire to stay warm.

The pair decide to turn themselves in but upon arriving at police headquarters they are taken to another room reserved for marriages and presumably are exonerated of the crimes and married.

Cast
 Buster Keaton as Elmer
 Dorothea Kent as Elmer's Girl
 Broderick O'Farrell as Mr. Reynolds
 Charles McAvoy
 Si Jenks as Farmer
 Fern Emmett as Farmer's Wife
 Jack Shutta
 Matthew Betz as Hood with Toothache (uncredited)
 Bud Jamison as Cop (uncredited)

See also
 Buster Keaton filmography

External links

 The E-Flat Man at the International Buster Keaton Society

1935 films
1935 comedy films
American black-and-white films
Educational Pictures short films
Films directed by Charles Lamont
American comedy short films
1930s American films